Civics is the study of the rights and obligations of citizens in society. The term derives from the Latin word civicus, meaning "relating to a citizen". The term relates to behavior affecting other citizens, particularly in the context of urban development.

Civic education is the study of the theoretical, political and practical aspects of citizenship, as well as its rights and duties. It includes the study of civil law and civil codes, and the study of government with attention to the role of citizens―as opposed to external factors―in the operation and oversight of government.

The term can also refer to a corona civica, a garland of oak leaves worn about the head like a crown, a practice in ancient Rome wherein someone who saved another Roman citizen from death in war was rewarded with a corona civica and the right to wear it.

Philosophical views

Ancient Sparta

Archidamus 
In his History of the Peloponnesian War, Thucydides ascribes a speech to Archidamus II in which he stresses the importance for Sparta of civic education for the Spartan virtues of toughness, obedience, cunning, simplicity, and preparedness:
French essayist Michel de Montaigne commended how Agesilaus II, the son of Archidamus, followed his father's approach closely:

Simonides 
Plutarch relates a comparison made by Simonides between Spartan education of citizens and horse husbandry:

Lycurgus 
According to the Roman historian Plutarch, the semi-legendary Lycurgus of Sparta considered education of the citizenry to be his main priority as framer of the Spartan constitution. Plutarch observes that 'the whole course of [Spartan] education was one of continued exercise of a ready and perfect obedience' in which 'there scarcely was any time or place without someone present to put them in mind of their duty, and punish them if they had neglected it.'

He also describes how the Spartans limited civic education so as to maintain social control over the young:

However, the youth were also required to express themselves forcefully and succinctly, as well to think and reflect on matters of civic virtue, including such questions as who is or is not a good citizen of Sparta. Montaigne would later praise this particular technique of education, admiring the way Spartan citizens spent their time learning to acquire virtues such as courage and temperance, to the exclusion of studying any other subject. Spartan boys were also taught music and songs in praise of courage and in condemnation of cowardice.

Essentially, the Spartan ideal of civic education was a process whereby the interest of the citizen becomes totally united with the interest of the polity, in a spirit of perfect patriotism: 'To conclude, Lycurgus bred up his citizens in such a way that they neither would nor could live by themselves; they were to make themselves one with the public good, and, clustering like bees around their commander, be by their zeal and public spirit carried all but out of themselves, and devoted wholly to their country.

Civic education for toughness and martial prowess was not only within the purview of Spartan men: Plutarch recounts how Lycurgus 'ordered the maidens to exercises themselves with wrestling, running, throwing the quoit, and chasing the dart' with a view to creating healthy children for the state.

Ancient Athens

Pericles 
Pericles' Funeral Oration provides insight into Athens' sharply contrasting form of civic education from Sparta, for personal freedom, rather than blind obedience, where he boasts that Athens is 'the school of Hellas', since: However, English philosopher Thomas Hobbes believed that the Athenians were only taught to think they had personal freedom in order to discourage them from seeking reform.

Crito 
In the Socratic dialogue Crito, Crito of Alopece learns from Socrates the importance in civic education of following expert opinion, rather than majority opinion. Socrates uses the analogy of the training gymnast, who he implies ought to follow his gymnastics trainer, not whatever the majority of people think about gymnastics. Crito also hears Socrates' argument that a citizen ought to obey his city's laws partly because it was his city which educated him for citizenship.

Aeschyslus 
In the Aristophanes comedy The Frogs, the character of the playwright Aeschylus scolds fellow tragedian Euripides for writing scenes pernicious to proper ideals of citizenship:

During his diatribe, he emphasises the importance of poetry to civic education: 

Similarly, Plutarch would later speak of the power of the poet Thales to, in the words of the English poet John Milton, 'prepare and mollify the Spartan surliness with his smooth songs and odes, the better to plant among them law and civility'. Plutarch also spoke of the deep influence of Homer's 'lessons of state' on Lycurgus, framer of the Spartan constitution.

Adrastus 
In the Euripides tragedy The Suppliants, King Adrastus of Argos describes how Hippomedon received his civic education for endurance, martial skill, and service to the state:

Adrastus also describes how Parthenopeus received his education for citizenship in his adopted city:

Ancient Rome

Aurelius 
In his Meditations, Marcus Aurelius tells of how he was educated as a citizen to value free speech, to refrain from rhetoric and giving hortatory lectures, and to perceive the defects of tyranny. From his brother he imbibed a specific ideal for the Roman state: He also followed the example of his adopted father Antoninus Pius, who he said kept careful watch of government administration and finances, was open to hearing ideas about how to serve the common good, and cared neither for ambition nor pandering to the popular will: Aurelius was also taught by his father how to live as a public figure restrained by modesty:

Early Modern England

Hobbes 
In his treatise Leviathan, English philosopher Thomas Hobbes heavily criticised the emphasis in contemporary civic education on studying Athenian democracy and Roman republicanism, saying that it wrongly encouraged monarchical subjects to restrain the actions of their monarchs. He thought that those citizens who imbibed the value of democracy from classic works were likely to oppose monarchy in the manner rabid dogs avoid water. Hobbes was deeply uncomfortable with Aristotelian civic education, which he said advised popular governance instead of monarchical rule.

Bacon 
English philosopher Francis Bacon was aware of the relevance of civic education to what he termed 'civil merit'. However, in his essay The Advancement of Learning, Bacon also argues that civic education should be preceded by religious and moral education, so that those who judge policy will not be under the influence of moral relativism.

Criticism of civic education 
Sudbury schools contend that values, social justice and democracy must be learned through experience as Aristotle said: "For the things we have to learn before we can do them, we learn by doing them." They adduce that for this purpose schools must encourage ethical behavior and personal responsibility. In order to achieve these goals schools must allow students the three great freedoms—freedom of choice, freedom of action and freedom to bear the results of action—that constitute personal responsibility. The "strongest, political rationale" for democratic schools is that they teach "the virtues of democratic deliberation for the sake of future citizenship." This type of education is often alluded to in the deliberative democracy literature as fulfilling the necessary and fundamental social and institutional changes necessary to develop a democracy that involves intensive participation in group decision making, negotiation, and social life of consequence.

See also

References